Pounce is a line of cat treats or snacks that are manufactured by The J.M. Smucker Company. The treats come in different flavors such as Tuna, Chicken, and Seafood Medley. In the 1980s, pounces were also available in such flavors as shrimp (packaged in a yellow container) and beef (packaged in a red container), vegetable (in a green container), and Italian Bread (in a white container).

Product recalls

On March 31, 2008, Del Monte Foods announced a recall of Pounce Meaty Morsels Moist Chicken Flavor Cat Treats, Codes TP7C12 and TP7C07, Best By: Sep 04 2008 and Sep 09 2008.

External links
 Official website

Cat food brands
Del Monte Foods brands